In enzymology, an arachidonate—CoA ligase is an enzyme that catalyzes the chemical reaction

ATP + arachidonate + CoA  AMP + diphosphate + arachidonoyl-CoA

The 3 substrates of this enzyme are ATP, arachidonate, and CoA, whereas its 3 products are AMP, diphosphate, and arachidonoyl-CoA.

This enzyme belongs to the family of ligases, specifically those forming carbon-sulfur bonds as acid-thiol ligases.  The systematic name of this enzyme class is arachidonate:CoA ligase (AMP-forming). This enzyme is also called arachidonoyl-CoA synthetase.

References

 

EC 6.2.1
Enzymes of unknown structure